"React" is the lead single from Erick Sermon's fifth studio album of the same name. The song was produced by Just Blaze and featured Sermon's fellow Def Squad member Redman. The song appears on the soundtrack to the 2003 film, Honey, and in the 2003 video game, NBA Street Vol. 2.

"React" became Sermon's second and last top-40 hit, reaching No. 36 on the Billboard Hot 100. The song sampled the Sahir Ludhianvi written song "Chandhi Ka Badan", which was performed by Meena Kapoor, on the song's hook. The translation of the sampled line is "If someone wants to commit suicide, so what can you do?" to which Sermon responds "Whatever she said, then I'm that". The use of the sample drew criticism from the Hindi-speaking community.

Track listing
"React" (Radio Mix)- 3:45 
"React" (Instrumental)- 3:44 
"React" (Club Mix)- 3:45 
"React" (Instrumental)- 3:44

Charts

Weekly charts

Year-end charts

References

2002 singles
2002 songs
Erick Sermon songs
Redman (rapper) songs
J Records singles
Song recordings produced by Just Blaze
Songs written by Erick Sermon
Songs written by Redman (rapper)